Suraj Ahuja (born 23 September 1999) is an Indian cricketer, who was a former captain of the India national under-19 cricket team. He made his Twenty20 debut on 4 November 2021, for Rajasthan in the 2021–22 Syed Mushtaq Ali Trophy.

See also
 List of India national cricket captains

References

External links
 

1999 births
Living people
Indian cricketers
Rajasthan cricketers